Royal Oak is a village in County Durham, in England. It is situated to the north west of Darlington.

References

Villages in County Durham